Turtle Chips (꼬북칩—Kkobuk Chip) are a brand of chips that are made by South Korean snack company Orion. They get their name from their shape, which resembles the shell of a tortoise.

Turtle Chips has been a popular snack since its release in March 2017. According to Orion, the unique crispiness from the four thin chips overlapping each other took eight years to develop. In February 2019, Orion obtained a patent for its manufacturing facility that develops the four-layered plates, giving it exclusive rights for the next 20 years.

Flavors 

 Corn Soup
 Cinnamon
 Sweet soybean (Injeolmi)
 Chocolate Churros
 Sweet Vanilla
 Shrimp
 Seaweed
 Truffle
 Flaming Mala
 Pink Himalayan Salt
 Flamin' lime (U.S. exclusive)
 Mexico Barbeque (China exclusive)

References 

Brand name snack foods
Brand name potato chips and crisps
Products introduced in 2017
South Korean brands